<div>Synod of the Mid-Atlantic is an upper judicatory of the Presbyterian Church (USA) based in Richmond, Virginia. The synod oversees fourteen presbyteries in DC and five Mid-Atlantic states (Delaware, Maryland, North Carolina, Virginia, and West Virginia).

History

Presbyteries of the Synod of the Mid-Atlantic

There are fourteen presbyteries in the synod. (map)

 Abingdon
 Atlantic Korean-American
 Baltimore
 Charlotte
 Coastal Carolina
 Eastern Virginia
 The James
 National Capital
 New Castle
 New Hope
 The Peaks
 Salem
 Shenandoah
 Western North Carolina

See also
 List of Presbyterian Church (USA) synods and presbyteries#Synod of Mid-Atlantic
 Presbyterian polity

References

External links
 Synod official website

Presbyterianism in the United States
History of Maryland
History of North Carolina
History of Virginia
History of West Virginia
Presbyterianism in West Virginia
Presbyterianism in Maryland
Presbyterianism in North Carolina
Presbyterianism in Virginia
Presbyterian synods